Golden Oak at Walt Disney World Resort is an upscale residential community within the Walt Disney World Resort in Lake Buena Vista, Florida. It was designed by Walt Disney Imagineering and is owned and operated by a newly formed Disney subsidiary, Golden Oak Realty within Disney Signature Experiences. The first phase of development is located southeast of the Magic Kingdom Park in Bay Lake. The area was named to pay homage to Walt Disney's Golden Oak Ranch in California. The first few home sites were available for purchase in late 2010 and completed in late 2011. Later on, a Four Seasons resort opened due north of the property with the company purchasing several properties to serve in its "private residences" initiative on the WDW property.

Overview
The community was announced on June 23, 2010, through the official Disney Parks Blog. Most homes are listed as multimillion-dollar properties aimed at the highly affluent. Nightly fireworks from the Magic Kingdom can be seen, and heard, from all of the homes. There are multiple lakes throughout the community as well as a small river, meaning some of the properties are technically lakefront. A clubhouse was constructed in the style of a quaint Italian villa alongside the community containing a game room, a restaurant, and a pool all available for free to the residents of Golden Oak. It hosts many of the social gatherings central to the community, serving as a hub for the entire community to bond over. Its design and construction were overseen by project manager David Hulme, a Georgetown and UNC alumnus. The clubhouse also has various scents pumped via the ventilation system, similar to many other Disney establishments.

Neighborhoods
Golden Oak has several neighborhoods dedicated to different eras of architecture.

Kimball Trace
The neighborhood is named for animator and member of Disney's Nine Old Men, Ward Kimball.

Silverbrook
This neighborhood was named after Walt Disney's first animation studio.

Carolwood
Carolwood is located at the northernmost part of the development. The largest houses are located here. It was part of an old golf course.

The name Carolwood is taken from Walt Disney's private railroad, which was built before Disneyland and its perimeter railroad opened in 1955.

Marceline
The neighborhood is named after Walt Disney's hometown of Marceline, Missouri.

Kingswell 
The initial homesites have half-acre lots.

Symphony Grove 
An homage to Silly Symphonies, Walt Disney's animated short-film classics, this new neighborhood is intended to be whimsical.

Notable residents 
H. Lee Scott, former CEO of Walmart

See also 

 Celebration, Florida – a concept high-end resort living community near the Walt Disney World resort also developed by The Walt Disney Company
 Seaside, Florida – a concept new urbanism resort living community in Walton County
Val d'Europe was built in conjunction with The Walt Disney Company
 New urbanism
 Storyliving by Disney

References

External links
 

Walt Disney World
New Urbanism communities
Planned communities in Florida
Gated communities in Florida
Real estate companies established in 2011
American companies established in 2011
2011 establishments in Florida
Populated places established in 2011